The silvery gibbon (Hylobates moloch), also known as the Javan gibbon, is a primate in the gibbon family Hylobatidae. It is listed as Endangered on the IUCN Red List since 2008, as the wild population is estimated at comprising less than 2500 mature individuals.

Its coat is bluish-grey in colour, with a dark grey or black cap. Like all gibbons, the silvery gibbon lacks an external tail, has dorsally placed scapulae, and reduced flexibility in its lumbar region. It has long, curved fingers and very long forelimbs relative to its hind limbs. On average, it reaches  in weight.
It is diurnal and arboreal, climbing trees skilfully and brachiating through the forests. Brachiation is possible because of its mobile wrist joints, full rotation of the upper arm, and the ability to lock elbows in suspension. Its diet consists of fruits, leaves, and flowers.

Every three years, on average, the female gives birth to a single young, after a gestation of seven months. The offspring is nursed for about 18 months and lives with the family group until it is fully mature at about eight to ten years old.

Threats and conservation
The silvery gibbon ranks among the most threatened primates. It is listed as Endangered on the 2009 IUCN Red List, with the population appearing more stable than in a 2004 assessment of the species being Critically Endangered, which suggested there was a 50% chance of the silvery gibbon becoming extinct within the next decade. Habitat destruction on densely populated Java continues to reduce the natural range of the species.  Many gibbons are also lost to the illegal pet trade, when adults are hunted so their young can be sold in the markets as pets. There are less than 2,000 silvery gibbons in the wild on eight sites that are considered to be genetically viable for the continuation of the species. There are also a dozen small, non-viable populations. Mount Halimun Salak National Park sustains the largest population of ca. 1,000 gibbons. Other large populations of several hundred are found in the Gunung Ciremai National Park and Gunung Gede Pangrango National Park. In the latter there is a Javan Gibbon Centre that rehabilitates ex-captive gibbons.

Several zoos operate silvery gibbon breeding programs. Despite these efforts, the future survival of this species is in question.

Behaviour and ecology
Like all gibbon species, the silvery gibbon lives in pairs and stakes out territory that the pair strongly defends; it has relatively small territories of about 42 acres. Females sing to declare their territory several times a day, and if strangers are spotted, the male screams loudly in an attempt to scare them away. The majority of the solo song bouts or scream bouts are produced by the females. The female vocal bouts occur after 0500 hr, with the vocal bout activity peaking around 0600 hr.  In contrast, the male vocal bouts primarily occur before 0500 hr. The males are usually very aggressive to others.

Classification
Some authors recognize two subspecies of Hylobates moloch:
 Western silvery gibbon or western Javan gibbon, H. m. moloch
 Eastern silvery gibbon or central Javan gibbon, H. m. pongoalsoni

References

External links

ARKive - images and movies of the Javan gibbon (Hylobates moloch)
http://www.gibbons.de

silvery gibbon
Fauna of Java
Endemic fauna of Indonesia
Endemic fauna of Java
Primates of Indonesia
Endangered fauna of Asia
Species endangered by the pet trade
silvery gibbon
silvery gibbon